Calliteara horsfieldii, or Horsfield's tussock moth, is a moth of the family Erebidae. The species was first described by the British entomologist Edward Saunders in 1851, and named in honor of the British  naturalist Thomas Horsfield, who traveled southern Asia and published works on zoology from the region. C. horsfieldii can be found in southern Asia, the islands of the northern Indian Ocean, and many parts of south east Asia and Indonesia. It is also sometimes referred to as the Yellow Tussock Moth.

Distribution
Calliteara horsfieldii is found the tropical portion of southern and southeast Asian including Sri Lanka, Thailand, Singapore, Malaysia, Sundaland, Sulawesi and towards New Guinea and Brunei.

Description
The males of Calliteara horsfieldii show two colour forms. The first has uniform greyish forewings, while the second form has darker greyish colors towards the antemedial side of the forewings. The antemedial side of the forewings is strongly curved. Females of this species have whitish forewings with faint markings. The hindwings of both sexes are similar to one another and have yellowish tinge. The caterpillar is yellowish with rows of dorsal brushes.

As caterpillar, Calliteara horsfieldii is known to feed on many plants such as Etlingera elatior, Anacardium occidentale (the Cashew tree), Mangifera, Casuarina, Begonia, Bixa orellana, Brassica, Albizia falcataria, Dipterocarpus, Hopea, Camellia sinensis (the tea plant), Shorea, Acacia richii, Acacia mangium, Cassia fistula, Casuarina equisetifolia, Cinnamomum zeylanicum (the Cinnamon tree), Cocos nucifera (the Coconut palm), Erythrina, Pterocarpus, Tamarindus (the Tamarind), Lagerstroemia (the Crape myrtle), Ficus, Eucalyptus, Eugenia, Psidium, Syzygium, Pinus (the Pine) and Rosa (the Rose) species.

References

External links
Yellow Tussock Moth (Calliteara horsfieldii)
Torch ginger and Tussock Moth Calliteara horsfieldii
Final instar caterpillar and metamorphosis of Calliteara horsfieldii (Saunders) in Singapore (Lepidoptera: Lymantriidae: Orgyiini)

Moths of Asia
Moths described in 1851